Isaac Roosevelt (December 19, 1726 – October 1794) was an American merchant and Federalist politician. He served in the New York State Assembly and the state Constitutional Convention and achieved the most political success of any Roosevelt before Theodore Roosevelt. Isaac was the patrilineal great-great-grandfather of President Franklin Delano Roosevelt. He was the second generation of what would later come to be known as the Hyde Park, New York branch of the extended Roosevelt family. Isaac's fortune from the refining of sugar, and his political accomplishments, became an essential root of the substantial wealth, prominence and influence that the Hyde Park Roosevelts came to amass.

Early life
Roosevelt was born in New York City and baptized in the Reformed Dutch Church of New York.  He was the sixth son of Jacobus Roosevelt (1692–1776) and Catharina Hardenbroek, who wed in 1713.  His siblings were Johannes (b. 1714), Johannes (b. 1715), Nicholas (b. 1717), Helena (1719–1772), Jacobus (b. 1721), Christoffel (b. 1724), Abraham (b. 1729), Sara (b. 1730), and Adolphus Roosevelt (b. 1735).

His paternal grandfather was Nicholas Roosevelt (1658–1742) and his great-grandfather was the Dutch immigrant Claes Maartenszen Van Rosenvelt (d. 1659), who established the Roosevelt family in America.  His maternal grandparents were Johannes Hardenbroek and Sarah (née Van Laer) Hardenbroek.

Career

Isaac Roosevelt was one of the first large-scale sugar refiners in New York City. During the 1700s, sugar was Europe's most valuable traded agricultural commodity, and it was cultivated almost entirely by slave labor in the Caribbean. Sugar cultivation also entailed an especially high death rate among slaves, due to difficult conditions and disease. During that time, slavery remained legal in New York, and New York City became a center of sugar refining and of the global sugar trade:  Roosevelt built one of the first sugar refineries in the city, and originally had his store on Wall Street, later removing to St. George's Square.

Active in the community, he was one of the first members of the New York City Chamber of Commerce, organized in 1768, and he was one of the original incorporators of the first public hospital in New York in 1770.  In 1784, he was a cofounder of the Bank of New York, one of the oldest  banks in America.  In 1786, he succeeded fellow founder Alexander Hamilton to become the bank's second president, a post he held until 1791. Roosevelt was succeeded by Gulian Verplanck, Speaker of the New York State Assembly.

Political office
A noted patriot, he was elected to the New York Provincial Congress on April 22, 1775. He was one of the Committee of One Hundred that took control of the state government in May 1775. Though he felt no allegiance to England, he was initially a moderate, hoping to prevent conflict. However, he withdrew from New York when the British occupied the city, and spent the period of occupation at his wife's home in Dutchess County, serving with the Sixth Regiment of the Dutchess County Militia.

After the war, as one of ten representatives from New York City (among John Jay, Alexander Hamilton, and Robert R. Livingston), he took part in the New York State Convention at Poughkeepsie on June 18, 1788 that deliberated on the adoption of the United States Constitution. He was a member of the New York State Senate (Southern District) from 1777 to 1786, and from 1788 to 1792.

Personal life
On September 22, 1752, he married Cornelia Hoffman (1734–1780), great granddaughter of one of the first Estonians in the United States and daughter of Tryntje (née Benson) (1712–1765) and Martinus Hoffman (1706–1772), a prominent Dutchess County landowner and member of the Hoffman family.  She was the sister of Anthony Hoffman (1739–1790) and the aunt of Josiah Ogden Hoffman (1766–1837).  After her mother's death, Cornelia's father Martinus, married Alida Livingston Hansen, a member of the Livingston family who was the widow of Henry Hansen and younger sister of Philip Livingston, a signer of the Declaration of Independence.   Together, Isaac and Cornelia had ten children:

 Abraham Roosevelt (b. 1753), who died young
 Martinus Roosevelt (b. 1754), who died young
 Catharine Roosevelt (b. 1756), who died unmarried
 Sarah Roosevelt (b. 1758), who died unmarried
 Jacobus "James" Roosevelt III (1760–1847), who married Maria Eliza Walton (1769-1810), then Catharine Elizabeth Barclay (c. 1783-1816), then Harriet Howland (1784-1856).
 Cornelia Roosevelt (b. 1761), who died young
 Maria Roosevelt (b. 1763), who married Richard Varick (1753–1831), a Mayor of New York City.
 Martin Roosevelt (1765–1781), who died at College.
 Cornelia Roosevelt (1767–1818), who married Dr. Benjamin Kissam (1759–1803) on January 10, 1786.
 Helen Roosevelt (b. 1768), who died unmarried.

Roosevelt died in October 1794.

Descendants
Through his son, James, he was a grandfather to Isaac Roosevelt (1790–1863) who married Mary Rebecca Aspinwall (1809–1886), Grace Roosevelt (1792–1828), who married Guy Carlton Bayley (1786–1859), James Roosevelt (1794-1823), Walton Roosevelt (1796–1836), Edward Roosevelt (1799–1832), Richard Varick Roosevelt (1801–1835) who married Anna Maria Lyle, Hamilton Roosevelt (1805-1827), Henry Walton Roosevelt (1809–1827), Susan Barclay Roosevelt (1813–1867), and James Barclay Roosevelt (b. 1815).

Through his daughter Cornelia, he was a grandfather to: Cornelia Catharine Kissam who married Dr. Caspar Wistar Eddy, Benjamin Roosevelt Kissam (b. 1793) who married Mary A. Berdan, Maria Ann Kissan (1788–1871), Helen Kissam (1790–1870) who married John L. Lefferts, Richard Varick Kissam (1795–1869) who married Maria Latourette, Emma Charlotte Kissam who married Francis Armstrong Livingston (1795–1851) a nephew of Peter R. and Maturin Livingston, and Ameila Charlotte Kissam (b. 1799).

References
Notes

Sources

1726 births
1794 deaths
Isaac
American people of Dutch descent
New York (state) Federalists
New York (state) state senators
Hoffman family
18th-century American politicians